Anthia hexasticta is a species of ground beetle in the subfamily Anthiinae. It was described by Carl Eduard Adolph Gerstaecker in 1866.

References

Anthiinae (beetle)
Beetles described in 1866